Haplochromis barbarae is a species of cichlid endemic to Lake Victoria where it may now be extinct. This species can reach a length of  SL. The honors Barbara Williams who illustrated many of Greenwood's papers.

References

barbarae
Fish of Lake Victoria
Endemic freshwater fish of Uganda
Fish described in 1967
Taxonomy articles created by Polbot